Birgit Vanderbeke (8 August 1956 – 24 December 2021) was a German writer.

Biography
Born in Dahme, East Germany, Vanderbeke grew up in Frankfurt am Main, Hesse, after her family moved to West Germany in 1961.

Vanderbeke studied Law, Germanic and Romance languages. The English translation of her debut novel, by Jamie Bulloch was published in 2013 by Peirene Press as The Mussel Feast. Since 1993 she has been living in southern France.

She died on 24 December 2021, at age of 65.

Works
 , narrative. Rotbuch, Berlin 1990,  (1993 als Rotbuch-Taschenbuch, Band 77,  / als Fischer-TB Band 13 783, Frankfurt am Main 1997).
 Translation: The Mussel Feast, translator: Jamie Bulloch, Peirene, London 2013, 
 Fehlende Teile, narrative. Rotbuch, Berlin 1992, .
 Gut genug, narrative. Rotbuch, Berlin 1993,  (1996 als Rotbuch-Taschenbuch, Band 1030,  / als Fischer-Taschenbuch Band 13 785, Frankfurt am Main 1999).
 Ich will meinen Mord, Rowohlt, Berlin 1995, .
 Friedliche Zeiten, narrative. Rotbuch, Hamburg 1996,  (als Fischer-Taschenbuch, Band 13 786, Frankfurt am Main 2000).
 , narrative. Fest, Berlin 1997,  (als Hörbuch: 2 MC bei Hörverlag München 1998).
 Ich sehe was, was Du nicht siehst, Fest, Berlin 1999,  (als Fischer-Taschenbuch, Band 15 001, Frankfurt am Main 2001).
 Hexenreden (mit Gisela von Wysocki und Marlene Streeruwitz). In: Göttinger Sudelblätter, Wallstein, Göttingen 1999, .
 Ariel oder der Sturm auf die weiße Wäsche (editing and epilogue Ralph Schock). In: Rede an die Abiturienten des Jahrgangs 2000, Gollenstein, Blieskastel 2001, .
 Abgehängt, narrative. S. Fischer, Frankfurt am Main 2001,  (als Fischer-Taschenbuch, Band 15 622, Frankfurt am Main 2002).
 Gebrauchsanweisung für Südfrankreich, Piper 7515, München / Zürich 2002, .
 Geld oder Leben, S. Fischer, Frankfurt am Main 2003, .
 Schmeckt’s?, Cooking without taboos. S. Fischer, Frankfurt am Main 2004, .
 Sweet sixteen, S. Fischer, Frankfurt am Main 2005, .
 Die sonderbare Karriere der Frau Choi, S. Fischer, Frankfurt am Main 2007,  (als Fischer-Taschenbuch Band 17 460, Frankfurt am Main 2009).
 Das lässt sich ändern, Piper, München / Zürich 2011, .
 Die Frau mit dem Hund, Piper, München / Zürich 2012, .
 Der Sommer der Wildschweine, Piper, München / Zürich 2013, .
 Ich freue mich, dass ich geboren bin, Piper, München / Zürich 2016, .
 Wer dann noch lachen kann, novel. Piper, München / Zürich 2017, .
 Alle, die vor uns da waren, novel. Piper, München / Zürich 2020, .

Awards and honours 
1990 Ingeborg-Bachmann-Preis for Muschelessen
1997 Kranichsteiner Literaturpreis
1999 Solothurner Literaturpreis
1999 Roswitha Prize
2002 Hans Fallada Prize
2007  at University of Kassel
2014 Independent Foreign Fiction Prize shortlist for The Mussel Feast (German; trans. Jamie Bulloch)

References

External links
 

1956 births
2021 deaths
People from Dahme, Brandenburg
People from Bezirk Cottbus
20th-century German writers
21st-century German writers
20th-century German women writers
21st-century German women writers
Writers from Brandenburg